Nicola Jane Centofanti (born 1982) is an Australian politician. Since April 2022, she has been the Leader of the Opposition in the South Australian Legislative Council, Shadow Minister for Regional South Australia, Shadow Minister for Primary Industries, and Shadow Minister for Water Resources & the River Murray.  Centofanti was appointed to a casual vacancy in the South Australian Legislative Council representing the South Australian Division of the Liberal Party of Australia on 7 April 2020.

Prior to joining the parliament, Centofanti was a rural veterinarian in South Australia's Riverland region, and vice-president of the state division of the Liberal Party.

Background
Centofanti grew up in Berri in South Australia's Riverland. She attended the local high school in Glossop, before being accepted into Veterinary Science at Murdoch University in Western Australia. After graduating with a Bachelor of Veterinary Science with first class honours in 2004, Centofanti returned to South Australia and commenced her career at the Riverland Veterinary Clinic. In 2010, she became a member of the Australian and New Zealand college of veterinary scientists for small animal medicine.

Personal life
Centofanti is married with three children. She is a member of Rotary Berri, Legacy Club of South Australia and Broken Hill, Military Wives Choir as well as a trainer for the Berri Football Club.

References

1982 births
Living people
Members of the South Australian Legislative Council
Women members of the South Australian Legislative Council
Liberal Party of Australia members of the Parliament of South Australia
Australian veterinarians
21st-century Australian politicians
21st-century Australian women politicians